En un lugar de la marcha (English: Somewhere in the march) is the fourth studio album by Spanish heavy metal band Barón Rojo, released in 1985 by Chapa Discos.

The title of the album is a pun on the first line of the Miguel de Cervantes novel Don Quixote: "En un lugar de La Mancha, de cuyo nombre no quiero acordarme..." (In a village of La Mancha, the name of which I have no desire to call to mind...)

Track listing

Personnel
José Luis "Sherpa" Campuzano - bass, vocals
Armando De Castro - guitar. vocals
Carlos De Castro - guitar, vocals
Hermes Calabria - drums

References

1985 albums
Barón Rojo albums
Spanish-language albums